Gholamreza Forouzesh is an Iranian engineer and politician. He served as a Tehran councilman and the cabinet minister in charge of Jihad of Construction.

References 

 Biography

1945 births
Living people
Executives of Construction Party politicians
Tehran Councillors 1999–2003